Jack Chase (1914-1972) was an African-American middleweight, who boxed in the 1930s and 1940s. He was born in Texas and fought mainly on the west coast of the United States. He boxed under the name ‘Young Joe Lewis’ for the first part of his career, before changing to Jack Chase in 1942. His official fight count stands at 122, but it is believed he competed in an additional 40 plus fights prior to 1936, during which time his full record is unknown.

He was ranked second in the world in his division, but never took part in a world title fight. He is included in the set remembered as ‘Murderers’ Row’, a term used by Budd Schulberg to describe those boxers of the era who were so feared that they were avoided by title holders and so were unable to ever secure a title shot.

Jack Chase did win several regional belts in the US, including the Colorado state title, the Rocky Mountain Regional Middleweight and Welterweight Titles in the 1930s and the California State's Middlweight and Light Heavyweight titles in the 1940s. He retired from boxing in 1948.

Chase had several run ins with the law during his life, including serving jail time in Colorado on a few occasions and was arrested for shooting fellow boxer Aaron Wade in California.

Professional boxing record

See also 

 Murderers' Row (Boxing)

References

External Links
 

1914 births
1972 deaths
American male boxers
Boxers from Texas
Middleweight boxers
People from Sherman, Texas